During the 2000–01 season Brescia Calcio competed in Serie A and Coppa Italia.

Summary 
The club disputed its 17th campaign in Serie A after suffered relegation in 1997-98 Serie A season, finishing this time on a decent 8th spot, its best ever in the history of the franchise and clinches the classification to 2001 UEFA Intertoto Cup.

The team reaches the Coppa Italia Quarterfinals stage defeating Alzano Virescit, Brescello and Treviso in the first round, Vicenza in Second round and Juventus in Eightfinals, being eliminated by future Champion of the tournament Fiorentina. The season is best remembered by the transfer of 1993 European Footballer of the Year Roberto Baggio from Inter scoring 10 goals in League, and the loan in of young midfielder Andrea Pirlo which Mazzone deploys as Deep- lying playmaker resulting in his career breakthrough.  Forward Dario Hübner scored 24 goals prompting his transfer out to Piacenza Calcio at the end of the season.

Squad

Transfers

Winter

Competitions

Serie A

League table

Results by round

Matches

Coppa Italia

First round

Second round

Eightfinals

Quarterfinals

Statistics

Squad statistics

Players statistics

References

Bibliography

External Links 
 
 
 Serie A attendance statistics on stadiapostcards.com

Brescia Calcio seasons
Brescia